Raithby cum Maltby is a civil parish in the East Lindsey district of Lincolnshire, England.

The Grade II listed parish church at Raithby is dedicated to St Peter and dates from the late 13th century, although it was rebuilt in rendered brick in 1839 by W. A. Nicholson, paid for by Revd Henry Chaplin. It includes a late-13th-century north arcade, a 15th-century font, and some 16th-century imported glass. The chancel was restored in 1883 by C. H. Fowler.

References

External links

Civil parishes in Lincolnshire
East Lindsey District